RD-270 (Rocket Engine 270, 8D420) was a single-chamber liquid-bipropellant rocket engine designed by Energomash (USSR) in 1960–1970. It was to be used on the first stages of proposed heavy-lift UR-700 and UR-900 rocket families, as well as on the N1. It has the highest thrust among single-chamber engines of the USSR, 640 metric tons at the surface of Earth. The propellants used are unsymmetrical dimethylhydrazine (UDMH) and nitrogen tetroxide (N2O4). The chamber pressure was among the highest considered, being about 26 MPa. This was achieved by applying full-flow staged combustion cycle for all the incoming mass of fuel, which is turned into a gas and passes through a couple of turbines before being burned in the combustion chamber.

The engine testing was underway when the decision was made to cancel the program. Development was stopped with all other work on corresponding rocket projects on 11 December 1970.

History 
The development of RD-270 started on 26 June 1962. Preliminary investigations and development of the engine and its further production were performed under the guidance of Valentin Glushko and finished in 1967. It became the most powerful engine in the world to date that used high-boiling propellant. During 1967–1969, several test firings were performed with experimental engines that were adapted to work at sea level and had a short nozzle. In total, 27 test firings were performed with 22 engines, three engines were tested twice, and one of them was tested three times. All works stopped later together with corresponding activities on the UR-700 project.

The RD 270 was also considered for the R-56 rocket (although never formally adopted) until work on the design stopped in June 1964.

During development, Glushko studied the use of pentaborane "zip" propellants in a modified RD-270M engine.

Design 
The engine throttle range was 95–105%, the thrust vector control range was ±12° (project R-56) and ±8° for UR-700 rocket family. The oxidizer-to-fuel ratio was 2.67 and can be changed by up to 7%.

To achieve such a high specific impulse and pressure in combustion chamber as RD-270 has, two circuits of full-flow staged combustion cycle were applied. The pair of turbines with preburners turns the fuel into the gaseous form and circulates all of the fuel components. One of the turbines uses the fuel-rich gas to power a fuel pump, another one uses the oxidizer-rich gas to power the oxidizer pump. As a result, the main combustion chamber (MCC) burns only generator gas. The engine controller regulates the functions of the two independent fuel and oxidizer circuits.

With the purpose to cool MCC it has layered wall structure with four internal belts of slots. Some parts of nozzles are covered by zirconium dioxide for thermal protection.

See also 
 Rocket engine
 Staged combustion cycle
 RD-253 engine for "Universal Rocket" family.
 RD-170 comparable Russian RP-1/LOX engine with four combustion chambers.
 F-1 comparable RP-1/LOX engine.
 Raptor comparable contemporary methane engine.
 Proton rocket - successor of one of universal rocket series.
 N1 ("Carrier #1") - alternative rocket for Soviet lunar projects.

References

External links 
 Article title

Rocket engines of the Soviet Union
Rocket engines using hypergolic propellant
Rocket engines using full flow staged combustion cycle
Energomash rocket engines